Buynak may refer to:

Gordon Buynak, American ice hockey player
Buinak, a village in Iran